Mona Kent (1909–1990) was an American writer of radio and television scripts. 

She created several radio soap operas and is noted for having written every episode of Portia Faces Life, which was broadcast from 1940 to 1951. She contributed to the television science-fiction show Captain Video and His Video Rangers as well as numerous other adaptions and original stories for radio and television. 

She wrote one novel, Mirror, Mirror on the Wall (1949), published in hardcover by Rinehart & Company, New York. It was reprinted in paperback in 1950. In an interview with Time in 1949, Kent said that she enjoyed writing for radio but that at times she felt "shame" at turning out such melodramatic scripts.

External links 

 Mona Kent papers at the University of Maryland Libraries

References

1909 births
1990 deaths
20th-century American women writers